Museum Center may refer to:
Cincinnati Museum Center at Union Terminal, an institution for several museums in Union Terminal in Cincinnati, Ohio 
Museum Center at Five Points, a history museum in Cleveland, Tennessee, with exhibits on the history of the local region